Zing Zing Zingat is an Indian television musical game show in Marathi language originally aired on Zee Marathi. It was hosted by Aadesh Bandekar.

Reception

Special episode (2 hours) 
 21 April 2019 (Zee Marathi family)

Ratings

References

External links 
 
 Zing Zing Zingat at ZEE5

Zee Marathi original programming
Marathi-language television shows
Indian reality television series
2018 Indian television series debuts
2019 Indian television series endings